Constantin Ciocan (born 28 July 1943) is a former Romanian cyclist. He competed in the individual road race and team time trial events at the 1964 Summer Olympics.

References

External links
 

1943 births
Living people
Romanian male cyclists
Olympic cyclists of Romania
Cyclists at the 1964 Summer Olympics
Place of birth missing (living people)
People from Câmpina